Shahran (also Romanized as Shāhrān; also known as Shārān and Shārān Zardalān) is a village in Zardalan Rural District, Helilan District, Chardavol County, Ilam Province, Iran. At the 2006 census, its population was 90, in 18 families. The village is populated by Kurds.

References 

Populated places in Chardavol County
Kurdish settlements in Ilam Province